Werner Meng (22 February 1948 – 1 July 2016) was a German jurist and Director of the Europa-Institut since 1999 as well as the holder of the Chair of Public Law, International Law and European Law at Saarland University.

Career 
Werner Meng studied Law in Mainz and Lausanne (Switzerland). He obtained his doctorate and his Habilitation at the University of Mainz. He worked as research scholar at the Max Planck Institute for Foreign Public and International Law in Heidelberg from 1980 until 1989 as well as at the University of Michigan, School of Law, Ann Arbor, in 1985. After working as a lawyer in Munich for a few years, he took on the Chair of Public Law, International Law, European and International Trade Law at the Martin-Luther-University Halle-Wittenberg in 1993, where he was also director of the Institute for Trade Law from 1997-1999, and dean of the law faculty from 1998-1999. Since 1999, he is the holder of the Chair of Public Law, International Law and European Law, as well as the Director of the Europa-Institut, law department, of Saarland University. In 2009, he was appointed honorary professor at Yunnan University, Kunming, China.

Werner Meng was visiting professor at the Chicago Kent University, at the World Trade Institute Berne (Switzerland), the Amsterdam Law School, the University of Rijeka Law School (Croatia), the Tulane Law School (New Orleans), the Louisiana State University (Baton Rouge), the Hong Kong City University School of Law, the Beijing University School of Law, the Chinese Academy of Social Sciences (Beijing), the Université Pierre Mendès France Grenoble, the Wuhan University School of Law, the Panteion-University Athens (Greece), as well as visiting professorial fellow at the Institute of International Economic Law, Georgetown University School of Law, Washington D.C.
Prof. Meng produces publications especially on the fields of International Trade Law, general International Law, and European Union Law.

He died of cancer on 1 July 2016.

Research interests 
 WTO Law
 International Trade Law (especially the civil law aspect)
 International Financial Law
 International Investment Law
 International Economic Law
 EU Law
 German and Foreign Constitutional Law

Co-editorships 
 Journal of International Economic Law (JIEL)
 International Law Archives „Archiv des Völkerrechts“ (AVR)
 Journal for European Studies „Zeitschrift für Europarechtliche Studien“ (ZEuS)
 Publications of Europa-Institut, Saarland University – Law Department
 Saarbrücken Studies on International Law „Saarbrücker Studien zum Internationalen Recht“

Memberships 
 Vereinigung der deutschen Staatsrechtslehrer
 Deutsche Gesellschaft für Völkerrecht
 American Society of International Law
 Wissenschaftliche Gesellschaft für Europarecht
 International Law Association (ILA)
 Committee on International Trade Law
 Rat der deutschen ILA-Landesgruppe

References

External links 
 Literature from and about Werner Meng in the catalogue of the Deutsche Nationalbibliothek
 Literature from Werner Meng in the annual bibliography of Saarland University until 2005
 Literature from Werner Meng in the annual bibliography of Saarland Universität since 2006
 Official Website of the Chair
 Official Website of Europa-Institut
 Official Website of Saarland University

1948 births
2016 deaths
Deaths from cancer in Germany
Academic staff of Saarland University
Max Planck Institute for Comparative Public Law and International Law people
University of Michigan people